National parks and other protected areas cover 17% of Ethiopia's land area. They include:

National parks

Proposed national parks
 Afar Depression National Park
 Blue Nile Gorges National Park
 Dessa Forest National Park
 Donkoro Chaka National Park
 Lake Abbe National Park
 Malka Guba National Park
 Ogaden Desert National Park

Wildlife reserves
 Aledeghi Wildlife Reserve
 Awash-West Wildlife Reserve
 Chelbi Wildlife Reserve (Chelbi or Stephanie)
 Degodi Lark Reserve
 Gewane Wildlife Reserve
 Guassa Community Conservation Area
 Indeltu (Shebelle) Gorges Reserve
 Mille-Serdo Wildlife Reserve
 Shire Wildlife Reserve
 Tama Community Conservation Area (Tama Wildlife Reserve)

Sanctuaries
 Babile Elephant Sanctuary 
 Kuni-Muktar Mountain Nyala Sanctuary
 Senkelle Swayne's Hartebeest Sanctuary
 Yabelo Wildlife Sanctuary

Proposed sanctuaries
 Liben Plain Sanctuary
 Tullo Lafto-Sadden Wildlife Sanctuary

Controlled hunting areas
 Afdem-Gewane Controlled Hunting Area
 Akobo Controlled Hunting Area
 Awash West Controlled Hunting Area
 Boyo Swamp Controlled Hunting Area
 Dabus Valley Controlled Hunting Area
 Eastern Hararghe Controlled Hunting Area
 Erer-Gota Controlled Hunting Area
 Mizan-Teferi Controlled Hunting Area
 Murule Controlled Hunting Area
 Omo West Controlled Hunting Area
 Segen Valley Controlled Hunting Area
 Tedo Controlled Hunting Area

National forest priority areas
 Abelti Gibie National Forest Priority Area
 Abey-Albasa National Forest Priority Area
 Abobo-Gog National Forest Priority Area
 Aloshie-Batu National Forest Priority Area
 Anferara-Wadera National Forest Priority Area
 Arba-Minch National Forest Priority Area
 Arero National Forest Priority Area
 Babiya-Fola National Forest Priority Area
 Belete Gera National Forest Priority Area
 Bonga National Forest Priority Area
 Bore-Anferara National Forest Priority Area
 Bulki-Melakoza National Forest Priority Area
 Butajira National Forest Priority Area
 Chato-Sengi-Dengeb National Forest Priority Area
 Chilalo-Gallema National Forest Priority Area
 Chilimo-Gaji National Forest Priority Area
 Deme-Laha National Forest Priority Area
 Dengego-Melka Jedbu National Forest Priority Area
 Desa-A National Forest Priority Area
 Dindin-Arbagugu National Forest Priority Area
 Dire-Gerbicha National Forest Priority Area
 Dodola-Adaba-Lajo National Forest Priority Area
 Gara Muleta National Forest Priority Area
 Gebre Dima National Forest Priority Area
 Gedo National Forest Priority Area
 Gergeda National Forest Priority Area
 Gidole-Kemba National Forest Priority Area
 Godere National Forest Priority Area
 Goro-Bele National Forest Priority Area
 Gumburda-Grakaso	National Forest Priority Area
 Gura Ferda National Forest Priority Area
 Harena-Kokosa National Forest Priority Area
 Jalo-Addes National Forest Priority Area
 Jarso-Gursum National Forest Priority Area
 Jibat National Forest Priority Area
 Jorgo-Wato National Forest Priority Area
 Kahatasa-Guangua National Forest Priority Area
 Komto-Waga-Tsige National Forest Priority Area
 Konchi National Forest Priority Area
 Kubayo National Forest Priority Area
 Megada National Forest Priority Area
 Mena-Angetu National Forest Priority Area
 Menagesha-Suba National Forest Priority Area
 Munesa-Shashemene National Forest Priority Area
 Negele (Mankubssa) National Forest Priority Area
 Sekela Mariam National Forest Priority Area
 Sele Anderacha National Forest Priority Area
 Sheka National Forest Priority Area
 Sibu-Tole-Kobo National Forest Priority Area
 Sigmo-Geba National Forest Priority Area
 Tiro-Boter-Becho National Forest Priority Area
 Wof-Washa National Forest Priority Area
 Yabelo National Forest Priority Area
 Yayu National Forest Priority Area
 Yegof-Erike National Forest Priority Area
 Yeki National Forest Priority Area
 Yerer	National Forest Priority Area

International designations

UNESCO-MAB Biosphere Reserves
Kafa Biosphere Reserve
Lake Tana Biosphere Reserve
Majang Forest Biosphere Reserve
Sheka Forest Biosphere Reserve
Yayu Biosphere Reserve

World Heritage Sites
 Simien National Park

See also

 Wildlife of Ethiopia
 Ministry of Culture and Tourism (Ethiopia)

References

External links
 Ethiopian Wildlife Conservation Authority

National
Ethiopia

National parks
Ethiopia